The Newsroom is an American television drama series created by Aaron Sorkin, which premiered on the premium cable network HBO on June 24, 2012. The series concluded on December 14, 2014, and consists of 25 episodes over three seasons.
   
Jeff Daniels stars as Atlantis Cable News anchor Will McAvoy, who takes a mandatory leave of absence after a public tirade about America's shortcomings during a political debate. Upon his return, he discovers that most of his staff have quit. Seeing an opportunity to return to the glory days of televised news instead of ratings-driven infotainment, his boss Charlie Skinner (Sam Waterston) has hired Will's ex-girlfriend MacKenzie McHale (Emily Mortimer) as the new executive producer. McHale shares Skinner's vision of TV news, and she and Will immediately butt heads. The series is executive produced by Aaron Sorkin, Scott Rudin, and Alan Poul.

Series overview

Episodes

Season 1 (2012)

Season 2 (2013)

Season 3 (2014)

Ratings

References

Notes

External links 
 
 

Lists of American drama television series episodes
Episodes